Pierre Robin sequence-faciodigital anomaly syndrome, also known as Chitayat Meunier Hodgkinson syndrome, is a very rare genetic disorder which is characterized by the signs typical of Pierre Robin sequence along with facial dysmorphisms and digital anomalies. Intellect is not affected. It is thought to be inherited in an X-linked recessive manner.

Signs and symptoms 

This list comprises all the symptoms people with this disorder exhibit:

 Retrognathism (belonging to Pierre Robin sequence)
 Glossoptosis (belonging to Pierre Robin sequence)
 Cleft palate (belonging to Pierre Robin sequence)
 High forehead
 Tapering fingers
 Hyperconvex digital nails
 Fifth finger clinodactyly
 Distal brachyphalangy
 Triphalangeal thumb
 First metacarpophalangeal joints which subluxate easily

Epidemiology 

Only 2 cases have been described in medical literature: two half-brothers from Quebec, Canada who shared the same mother, these brothers suffered from the symptoms mentioned above. The mother only had mild hyperopia. The fathers and the mother weren't related and both the mother and the children were of French-Canadian descent.

References 

Genetic diseases and disorders